Las tandas del principal ("The Batches of the Principal") is a 1949 Mexican film. It was produced by Fernando de Fuentes.

Cast 
 Fernando Soler
 Mapy Cortés
 Luis Aldás
 Fernando Cortés
 Agustín Isunza
 Queta Lavat
 Lupe Inclán
 María Gentil Arcos
 Fanny Schiller
 Max Langler
 Salvador Quiroz
 Guillermo Bravo Sosa
 Eugenia Galindo
 Luis Mussot
 Ignacio Peón

External links 
 

1949 films
1940s Spanish-language films
Mexican black-and-white films
Mexican romance films
1940s romance films
1940s Mexican films